Ivana Elizabeth Mendoza Álvarez (born 19 May 1995) is a Paraguayan footballer who plays as a midfielder for Club Sol de América and the Paraguay women's national team.

International career
Mendoza represented Paraguay at the 2012 South American U-17 Women's Championship. She made her senior debut on 31 July 2019 against Mexico in the 2019 Pan American Games.

References

1995 births
Living people
Women's association football midfielders
Paraguayan women's footballers
Paraguay women's international footballers
Pan American Games competitors for Paraguay
Footballers at the 2019 Pan American Games
Club Sol de América footballers